Mikolaj Kwietniewski (born 30 April 1999) is a Polish professional footballer who plays as a midfielder for Ruch Chorzów.

Career
He started his career with English club Fulham.

References

1999 births
Sportspeople from Kielce
Living people
Polish footballers
Poland youth international footballers
Association football midfielders
Fulham F.C. players
Legia Warsaw II players
Legia Warsaw players
Bytovia Bytów players
Wisła Płock players
Skra Częstochowa players
Ruch Chorzów players
Ekstraklasa players
I liga players
III liga players